Downhome, formerly The Downhomer, is a magazine published by a company with the same name monthly in St. John's, Newfoundland and Labrador, Canada.

History and profile
The magazine was started in 1988 with the name Downhomer Newspaper. It focuses on lifestyle in Newfoundland and Labrador, with columns like Notes From Home, Family & Friends, Discovery, Healthy Living, Food & Leisure and features submissions by its reader in the forms of stories, poems, photos or letters. It is the largest paid circulation magazine in Atlantic Canada and is #31 among all paid circulation magazines in Canada. More than 50,000 copies of the magazine are published each month and are distributed worldwide. The magazine started as a tabloid publication in the Greater Toronto Area.

To complement the magazine, there are also two Downhome stores, one located in St. John's and the other in Twillingate. The company also sells items worldwide via its website and runs fundraisers for organizations and schools selling subscriptions and goods.

References

External links
Downhome
Downhome Forums (Kitchen)
Downhome Shop

1988 establishments in Ontario
Lifestyle magazines published in Canada
Monthly magazines published in Canada
Local interest magazines published in Canada
Magazines established in 1988
Magazines published in Toronto
Magazines published in Newfoundland and Labrador